Linda Siobhan Sparke is a British astronomer known for her research on the structure and dynamics of galaxies. She is a professor emerita of astronomy at the University of Wisconsin–Madison, and Explorers Program Scientist in the NASA Astrophysics Division.

Education and career
Sparke was born in London, and read mathematics as an undergraduate at the University of Cambridge. She completed a Ph.D. in astronomy in 1981 from the University of California, Berkeley; her dissertation was Swirling Gas Flows in Elliptical Galaxies.

After postdoctoral research at the Institute for Advanced Study, the University of Cambridge, and the Kapteyn Astronomical Institute, she became a faculty member at the University of Wisconsin–Madison. She retired in 2010 to become a professor emeritus, served as a program manager at the National Science Foundation for two years, and became research program manager in astrophysics at NASA and later Explorers Program Scientist at NASA.

Book
With John Gallagher III, Sparke is the author of the undergraduate textbook Galaxies in the Universe: an Introduction (Cambridge University Press, 2000; 2nd ed., 2006).

Recognition
Sparke was elected as a Fellow of the American Physical Society in 2002, after a nomination from the APS Division of Astrophysics. The fellowship citation noted her "studies of the structure and dynamics of galaxies, using orbital motions to probe both time-steady and time-varying gravitational potentials, and the distribution of dark matter". In 2020 she was named a Fellow of the American Astronomical Society (AAS), as one of 200 Legacy Fellows named to start the AAS Fellows program.

Her book Galaxies in the Universe: an Introduction won the Chambliss Astronomical Writing Award of the American Astronomical Society in 2008.

References

External links
Home page at the University of Wisconsin

Year of birth missing (living people)
Living people
21st-century American astronomers
20th-century British astronomers
Women astronomers
Alumni of the University of Cambridge
University of California, Berkeley alumni
University of Wisconsin–Madison faculty
Fellows of the American Physical Society
20th-century British women scientists
Fellows of the American Astronomical Society